The Bandito Tour (stylized as THE BANDITØ TØUR) is the sixth concert tour by the American musical duo Twenty One Pilots, in support of their fifth studio album Trench (2018). The tour began at the Bridgestone Arena in Nashville, Tennessee on October 16, 2018, and concluded early at the Aragon Ballroom in Chicago, Illinois on December 13, 2019, due to the COVID-19 pandemic.

Background and promotion 
On July 11, 2018, Twenty One Pilots ended their hiatus by releasing two singles, "Jumpsuit" and "Nico and the Niners". The same day both their album, Trench, and its accompanying tour, The Bandito Tour, were announced.  It was later revealed that indie rock musician Max Frost and electronic rock band Awolnation would join the band for the first North American leg of the tour. Due to overwhelming demand, the band added a second North American leg to their tour including shows in Canada, Mexico and the band's hometown, Columbus.

The band documented the tour through a series of videos including rehearsals for the tour, as well as clips from the tour itself.

Concert synopsis 

The Bandito Tour is set in three parts: an opening on the "A-stage" followed by a performance on the "B-stage" and concludes with a second "A-stage" performance and an encore. The show begins with Josh Dun, alone on stage, his face obscured by a yellow bandana and holding a lit torch. As he sits down at the drums, Tyler Joseph rises from below the stage onto a burning car and begins singing "Jumpsuit" followed by "Levitate". During "Fairly Local", Joseph seemingly falls on stage, only to appear a few seconds later in the upper bowl before removing his ski mask. A brief interlude plays over the song "Today's Your Day (Whachagonedu?)" by Fatlip, showing the journey of Tyler's red beanie from many of the music videos supporting Blurryface. The beanie is then dropped down from the ceiling by a wire, and Tyler puts it on. The band then plays their breakthrough single, "Stressed Out", followed by "Heathens", on which Joseph plays a piano intro. The duo then plays "We Don't Believe What's on TV" and "The Judge", Joseph dressed in a floral kimono, before performing "Lane Boy" during which two masked men run on stage to shower the crowd with smoke. Joseph sings and walks across a suspended sky bridge to the b-stage while singing "Nico and the Niners".

Joseph sits down at the piano while Dun runs through the crowd to the b-stage to play "Neon Gravestones" before singing "Bandito" with the crowd. He then walks back on to the bridge singing "Pet Cheetah" and incites the crowd to jump around to the final drop. Dun then returns to the stage and battles himself on the drums, with the other Dun projected onto the screen. During "Holding on to You", Joseph raps the first verse held up by the front row of the crowd before Dun performs his trademark backflip off the piano. Joseph performs a soft piano intro that leads into "Cut My Lip." After singing "Ride", Joseph divides the crowd in half during "My Blood" to sing along to the falsetto chorus of the song. The band then performs "Morph", which is ended with Dun playing a miniature drumset held up by the crowd. Joseph climbs and stands on top of a narrow scaffolding tower during "Car Radio", before leaving the stage. They return for the encore, performing "Chlorine" while rising into the air on platforms. They then perform the final track off the tour's associated album "Leave the City" before singing the show's final song "Trees", as is traditional during their shows, and closing the song off on top of the audience playing drums as yellow confetti flies through the air.

Critical reception

First North American leg 
Gab Ginsberg, writing for Billboard, called the show a "must-see" following the band's performance at Madison Square Garden in New York City, saying "From gravity-defying jumps and flips, to sprinting around and under the arena, Tyler Joseph and Josh Dun continue to prove that they're one of the hardest-working — and most athletic — bands out there." Forbes' Steve Baltin also gave the tour a positive review following the band's performance at The Forum in Inglewood, calling the duo "such a vital band for rock", writing "The show ended, as it has for the past few years, with the moving "Trees," which involves the whole audience singing along. It's a powerful moment that encapsulates everything that makes Twenty One Pilots so special — the connection with the audience, the songs and the passion of everyone involved." Various local reviews were similarly positive.

Oceanian leg 
Mark Beresford of The Music gave the band's show at the RAC Arena in Perth a positive review, saying "this band is a live act who only care about one thing when performing, which is to outshine even the loftiest expectations, and based on the deafening screams from the Perth fans, they've nailed it." Stuff's Melanie Earley was similarly positive and said "Twenty One Pilots have helped to bring hope to an entire room full of people, and within there lies the real magic."

European leg 
Zoe Watson of Belfast Live gave the band's show at the SSE Arena full marks, hailing it as "one of the most exciting and exhilarating shows she had seen at the SSE." Following their show at the SSE Arena in London, Stevie Chick of The Guardian stated that the band delivered "their hook-studded songs and polymorphic pop with a showmanship that would impress even PT Barnum", and gave the show four stars. Elizabeth Aubrey gave the show the same score in her review for the Evening Standard, writing that "while occasionally the aesthetics could detract from the band's lyrical message, the ambition of their striking Bandito Tour impressed and was clearly adored by fans." Anna Smith of Gigwise praised the show, stating that "Tyler's voice exceeds expectations the whole show through, and Josh's seemingly inhuman ability to smash drums for 120 minutes straight allays any doubt that these guys have tricked their way to the top", and added that the band is "A truly phenomenal act deserving of such a committed, devoted fanbase." James Hall of The Daily Telegraph was more critical of the show, giving it three stars, stating that "anything goes in this streaming world" as "an evening that starts with a burning car can actually turn out to be a night of wholesome, fun and unthreatening entertainment."

Controversy 
Following the band's performance at the SSE Arena in Belfast on March 2, 2019, Jim Allister, the leader of the Traditional Unionist Voice, a unionist political party, condemned the show for its "inappropriate" imagery, which included a burning car and the donning of a balaclava, due to the history of the Troubles. He stated that "balaclavas still speak loudly in Northern Ireland of the evils of terrorism, with many still struggling to cope with the devastation and murder wrought by balaclava-clad killers," and added that "we also have to bear in mind the age profile of probably an impressionable audience – that's another reason why this imagery was inappropriate." This prompted numerous fans of Twenty One Pilots to defend the band as "they should not compromise one stage of the tour to cater to Northern Ireland sensitivities."

Commercial performance 
According to Pollstar, in 2018, the first North American leg of the tour grossed $10.2 million in total, averaging 12,597 tickets sold and $929,070 per show. From the 6th to the 27th of February 2019, the tour grossed $6,676,182. On May, the tour grossed  $4,811,499. On June, the tour grossed $4,149,864. On October, the tour grossed $5,197,618. On November, the tour grossed $4,277,779. The tour grossed $23.1 million during the first half of 2019, ranking at 30th place for that time period. The tour ranked at #36 on the Billboard 2019 Top Touring Artists and grossed $49.1 million in total, averaging 726,952  tickets sold. The tour ranked, respectively, at #47 and #55 at the Pollstar Top 2019 Worldwide and North American tours list.

Set lists

Shows

Festivals & Other Concerts

Cancelled shows

Accolades

Notes

References 

2018 concert tours
2019 concert tours
Twenty One Pilots
Concert tours of North America
Concert tours of South America
Concert tours of Oceania
Concert tours of Europe